A ravine is a landform.

Ravine may also refer to:

 Ravine, Pennsylvania, U.S., a census-designated place
 Ravine, a locality in Yellowhead County, Alberta, Canada
 The Ravine, a 1969 film by Paolo Cavara
 The Ravine (novel), a 2008 novel by Paul Quarrington
 "Ravine", a song by Ace of Base from The Bridge, 1995

See also
 
 
 Ravinia (disambiguation)